Jerick Roman Lamar Hoffer (born September 18, 1987), better known by the stage name Jinkx Monsoon, is an American drag performer, actor, comedian and singer best known for winning the fifth season of RuPaul's Drag Race and the seventh season of RuPaul's Drag Race All Stars, becoming the first person to win two seasons of the show across its iterations. Their first studio album, The Inevitable Album, was released in 2014, followed by their second studio album, The Ginger Snapped, in 2018. Jinkx appears in the WOW Presents Plus original, Sketchy Queens, a series they created alongside Liam Krug.

Early life
Jerick Hoffer was born in Portland, Oregon, and first performed in drag at age 15 at the all-ages Escape Nightclub. Their original drag name was going to be "Heidi Destruction" before settling on Jinkx Monsoon. They attended da Vinci Arts Middle School and Grant High School. Hoffer was raised Catholic, and discovered Russian-Jewish ancestry on their mother's side at the age of 18. Their drag character, Jinkx, is characterized as Jewish as a way of reconnecting with this part of their heritage. Hoffer worked as a custodian through college and graduated with a BFA in theater from Cornish College of the Arts in 2010. They have lived in Seattle, Washington since 2006. By October 2018, they moved back to Portland and lived in a house named Monsoon Manor.

Career

2011-2012: Career beginnings
After moving to Seattle from Portland, Hoffer and creative partner Nick Sahoyah wrote and starred in multiple Funny or Die webisodes titled Monsoon Season in which they played Jinkx Monsoon as an overbearing, substance addled, near-psychotic mother to Nick Sahoyah's character, Kamikaze Monsoon. In 2011, Hoffer appeared in the Wes Hurley film Waxie Moon in Fallen Jewel. In June 2011, Hoffer became the subject of a YouTube docu-series by Alex Berry, a Seattle videographer. Named after Death Becomes Her, one of Jinkx's favorite movies, Drag Becomes Him explores Hoffer's life in and out of drag. The series has continued since the finale of RuPaul's Drag Race and offers insight into their life since the show. On February 28, 2013, the first screening at Seattle's Central Cinema was hosted by Monsoon and Waxie Moon.

In January 2012, Hoffer appeared as Moritz in the rock musical Spring Awakening at the Balagan Theater in Seattle. Controversy arose from The Seattle Times review by Misha Berson, who said that they were "overly flamboyant" for the role. Dan Savage defended Hoffer's portrayal of Moritz. From July 21 to August 19, they starred as Angel in the 5th Avenue Theatre's production of the musical RENT.

2012–2017: RuPaul's Drag Race, Drag Becomes Him, and The Inevitable Album

In November 2012, Logo announced that Jinkx Monsoon was among fourteen drag queens who would be competing on the fifth season of RuPaul's Drag Race. Hoffer was inspired to audition after seeing Sharon Needles on the fourth season of the show. Monsoon won the main-challenges for the episodes "Snatch Game" and "Drama Queens". For the "Snatch Game", Monsoon impersonated Edith Bouvier Beale. Monsoon also impersonated third-season contestant Mimi Imfurst in the episode "Lip Synch Extravaganza Eleganza". As part of RuPaul's Drag Race, Monsoon sang on the "We Are the World"-inspired song "Can I Get an Amen?". The song's proceeds helped benefit the Los Angeles Gay and Lesbian Center. Monsoon won RuPaul's Drag Race season 5.

In January 2013, Hoffer played Hedwig in the Moore Theatre's production of the rock musical Hedwig and the Angry Inch. Balagan reprised the production in December 2013 for a week long run with Hoffer and the original cast/production team. In June 2013, they played Velma Von Tussle in the Seattle Men's Chorus/5th Avenue Theatre's production of the musical Hairspray.

Hoffer also performed as Jinkx Monsoon in the original one act cabaret musical The Vaudevillians under the name "Kitty Witless." They are accompanied by musical partner and co-creator Richard Andriessen who performs under the name "Dr. Dan Von Dandy." The Vaudevillians performed at the Laurie Beechman Theatre in New York City from July to November 2013. After touring Australia with The Vaudevillians, they received a nomination for the Helpmann Award for Best Cabaret Performer. In 2013, Hoffer was chosen as one of the Artists of the Year by City Arts magazine along with Megan Griffiths, Macklemore, Ryan Lewis, and Wes Hurley. They played Tallulah/Dennis, the owner of Lipstick Lounge in an episode of Blue Bloods entitled "Manhattan Queens", which aired on January 31, 2014.

In October 2013 it was announced that Drag Becomes Him was being turned into a feature-length film with Seattle-based producer Basil Shadid on board. A Kickstarter campaign in March 2014 successfully raised funds to complete the project. On March 26, 2015, Hoffer announced on their Instagram page that the film would premiere at the Cinerama in Seattle on April 29, 2015.
In December 2014, an animated version of Hoffer appeared in the "RuPaul's Drag Race: Dragopolis 2.0" mobile app.

On May 6, 2014, Monsoon released their debut studio album The Inevitable Album through Sidecar Records. The album is a blend of blues, jazz, traditional pop, and cabaret, and was inspired by artists like Bette Midler, Marlene Dietrich, Peggy Lee, Amanda Palmer, and Regina Spektor. The song "The Bacon Shake" features Fred Schneider of The B-52s, and tells of "a bawdy, after-hours gentleman's club and this woman is 'getting the boys thirsty,' and it turns into a big dance that everyone joins."

In 2015, Hoffer joined the cast of Wes Hurley's comedy series Capitol Hill.

In May 2017, Monsoon appeared in the celebrity roast of Michael Musto alongside Bianca Del Rio, Orfeh, Michael Riedel, Randy Rainbow, Crystal Demure, Countess Luann de Lesseps, Judy Gold, and Randy Jones. The roast which was produced by Daniel DeMello and directed by Rachel Klein, was hosted by Bruce Vilanch and introduced by Rosie O'Donnell.

2018–present: The Ginger Snapped, The Jinkx & DeLa Holiday Special, and RuPaul's Drag Race All Stars

On January 12, 2018, Monsoon released their second studio album The Ginger Snapped through Producer Entertainment Group. The album is inspired by 90s grunge, garage rock, and ska, and features appearances from Amanda Palmer, Fred Schneider, and Lady Rizo. They released an animated music video for the song "Cartoons and Vodka" which sees Monsoon transform into various cartoon styles, including Betty Boop, The Jetsons, Sailor Moon, Doug, Dragon Ball Z, Steven Universe, Beavis and Butt-Head, Adventure Time, Rick and Morty, Peanuts, Dexter's Laboratory, The Powerpuff Girls, and The Fairly OddParents. The same month Hoffer voiced the character Emerald on Steven Universe in the episode "Lars of the Stars".

In 2019, Hoffer was cast as Calliope in a North American tour of the musical Xanadu, though the tour was ultimately cancelled due to low ticket sales. In June 2019, a panel of judges from New York magazine placed Monsoon 18th on their list of "the most powerful drag queens in America", a ranking of 100 former Drag Race contestants.

In 2020, Hoffer appeared in the Hulu original Christmas film Happiest Season. The same year they starred and co-wrote The Jinkx and DeLa Holiday Special, a feature-length holiday film with fellow Seattle drag queen BenDeLaCreme based on their various Christmas shows over the years. The duo toured the show around the world in 2021.

In April 2022, it was announced that Jinkx would be competing on the seventh season of RuPaul's Drag Race All Stars, the first all winners edition of the franchise. They won the Snatch Game in the second episode with their impressions of Natasha Lyonne and Judy Garland. They also won the fourth, fifth, ninth, and tenth episodes. On July 29, 2022, they were crowned the winner and anointed with the title "Queen of All Queens."

In November 2022, it was announced that Hoffer would join the Broadway company of the musical Chicago, playing the role of Mama Morton for eight weeks starting January 16, 2023.

Personal life
Hoffer identifies as "non-gendered" or non-binary, and goes by singular they pronouns when not in drag. In an April 2017 interview, Monsoon stated, "I've never identified as fully male. I've always identified as more gender fluid or gender ambiguous, but I never knew the vocabulary to explain it for myself."

Hoffer suffers from narcolepsy, a fact that they revealed in the season five premiere of RuPaul's Drag Race.

In January 2021, Hoffer married their partner Michael Abbott in a small ceremony at home with their friends and family witnessing through video call. The marriage was officiated by comedian Deven Green.

Politics
Hoffer is very outspoken on their Instagram and Twitter about former US President Donald Trump and LGBT equality. They are a Democratic Party supporter and donated to both Elizabeth Warren's and Bernie Sanders's campaigns to be the Democratic nominee for president in 2020.

Artistry
Hoffer's drag persona is inspired by their mother and the comedians Lucille Ball, Maria Bamford, Deven Green, and Sarah Silverman. Their drag persona's last name, Monsoon, is derived from the character Edina Monsoon from the British sitcom Absolutely Fabulous. Hoffer also performs as the drag character Deirdre A. Irwin, who is a Southern medium.

Discography

Albums

Studio albums

Remix albums

Soundtrack albums

Commentary albums

Extended plays

Singles

Featured singles

Other appearances

Music videos

Filmography

Film

Television

Music videos

Web series

Theatre

Awards and nominations

See also
 LGBT culture in Seattle
 List of LGBT people from Portland, Oregon

References

External links

 
 

1987 births
Living people
American drag queens
American people of Russian-Jewish descent
Cornish College of the Arts alumni
American gay actors
American gay musicians
American male voice actors
American voice actresses
Grant High School (Portland, Oregon) alumni
Jewish American artists
Actors from Portland, Oregon
LGBT Jews
LGBT people from Oregon
LGBT people from Washington (state)
American LGBT singers
People from Seattle
People with narcolepsy
American non-binary actors
Jinkx Monsoon
Non-binary drag performers
Patreon creators
Non-binary musicians
20th-century LGBT people
21st-century LGBT people
RuPaul's Drag Race All Stars contestants
RuPaul's Drag Race All Stars winners
Genderfluid people